Nemanjić Dynasty: The Birth оf The Kingdom ( / Nemanjići: Rađanje Kraljevine) is a Serbian historical drama television series about the Serbian medieval dynasty Nemanjići. The pilot episode aired on 31st of December in 2017., as a special episode for New Year’s Eve, and the series premiered on Radio Television of Serbia on 17 February 2018. After broadcasting the pilot episode, critics were mostly negative, especially about the language and anachronisms used in the episode, special effects, and acting.

Series overview

Roles

Real characters

Fictional characters

References

External links
 

Serbian television series
Nemanjić dynasty
Television shows set in Serbia
Television shows filmed in Serbia
Films about Orthodoxy
Television series about Christianity
Cultural depictions of Saint Sava
Cultural depictions of Serbian monarchs
Cultural depictions of Stefan Nemanja
Radio Television of Serbia original programming